In fluid dynamics, the lift coefficient is a dimensionless quantity that relates the lift generated by a lifting body to the fluid density around the body, the fluid velocity and an associated reference area. A lifting body is a foil or a complete foil-bearing body such as a fixed-wing aircraft.  is a function of the angle of the body to the flow, its Reynolds number and its Mach number. The section lift coefficient  refers to the dynamic lift characteristics of a two-dimensional foil section, with the reference area replaced by the foil chord.

Definitions 
The lift coefficient CL is defined by

 ,
where 
The choice of the reference surface should be specified since it is arbitrary. For example, for cylindric profiles (the 3D extrusion of an airfoil in the spanwise direction) it is always oriented in the spanwise direction, but while in aerodynamics and thin airfoil theory the second axis generating the surface is commonly the chordwise direction:

resulting in a coefficient:

while for thick airfoils and in marine dynamics, the second axis is sometimes taken in the thickness direction:

resulting in a different coefficient:

The ratio between these two coefficients is the thickness ratio:

The lift coefficient can be approximated using the lifting-line theory, numerically calculated  or measured in a wind tunnel test of a complete aircraft configuration.

Section lift coefficient 

Lift coefficient may also be used as a characteristic of a particular shape (or cross-section) of an airfoil.  In this application it is called the section lift coefficient . It is common to show, for a particular airfoil section, the relationship between section lift coefficient and angle of attack. It is also useful to show the relationship between section lift coefficient and drag coefficient.

The definition becomes

where L is the reference length that should always be specified: in aerodynamics and airfoil theory usually the airfoil chord  is chosen, while in marine dynamics and for struts usually the thickness  is chosen. Note this is directly analogous to the drag coefficient since the chord can be interpreted as the "area per unit span".

For a given angle of attack, cl can be calculated approximately using the thin airfoil theory, calculated numerically or determined from wind tunnel tests on a finite-length test piece, with end-plates designed to ameliorate the three-dimensional effects. Plots of cl versus angle of attack  show the same general shape for all airfoils, but the particular numbers will vary. They show an almost linear increase in lift coefficient with increasing angle of attack with a gradient known as the lift slope.  For a thin airfoil of any shape the lift slope is π2/90 ≃ 0.11 per degree. At higher angles a maximum point is reached, after which the lift coefficient reduces. The angle at which maximum lift coefficient occurs is the stall angle of the airfoil, which is approximately 10 to 15 degrees on a typical airfoil.

The stall angle for a given profile is also increasing with increasing values of the Reynolds number, at higher speeds indeed the flow tends to stay attached to the profile for longer delaying the stall condition. For this reason sometimes wind tunnel testing performed at lower Reynolds numbers than the simulated real life condition can sometimes give conservative feedback overestimating the profiles stall.

Symmetric airfoils necessarily have plots of cl versus angle of attack symmetric about the cl axis, but for any airfoil with positive camber, i.e. asymmetrical, convex from above, there is still a small but positive lift coefficient with angles of attack less than zero. That is, the angle at which cl = 0 is negative. On such airfoils at zero angle of attack the pressures on the upper surface are lower than on the lower surface.

See also 
 Lift-to-drag ratio
 Drag coefficient
 Foil (fluid mechanics)
 Pitching moment
 Circulation control wing
 Zero lift axis

Notes

References 
 L. J. Clancy (1975): Aerodynamics. Pitman Publishing Limited, London, 
 Abbott, Ira H., and Doenhoff, Albert E. von (1959): Theory of Wing Sections, Dover Publications New York, # 486-60586-8

Aerodynamics
Aircraft wing design
Dimensionless numbers of fluid mechanics